The Final Four is a Greek television talent show based on an Israeli format The Four. It began airing on ANT1 on October 6, 2019.

Production
The Final Four was often mentioned in January–February 2019 by the media as the new reality show on the Greek television. Even though no broadcaster had officially announce the show, ANT1 was the possible channel that would host the show. On June 13, 2019, it was announced with a trailer that ANT1 bought the rights for the show.

"The Final Four" has been featured in USA, Brazil, Peru, Russia, Lithuania, Romania, Kazakhstan and Israel, recording record-breaking recordings on TV shows, and is expected to be shown in Spain.

Auditions
The producer auditions of the first season started on July 4, 2019, and ended on September 4, 2019.

Format 
Beginning with the final, "The Final Four" counts backwards for the winner.  Four determined and competitive contestants are preparing to fight to defend and keep their place in the biggest musical battle.  Opposite them will find many talented contestants who will try singing to ... detract from them and take their place in the stage of "The Final Four".

Every episode is a step closer to victory, and every week there is an overturn.  Who makes it one of "The Final Four", to the win, and eventually win a contract with a big record company and also €50,000?

Judges and host 
Several artists were rumored to be part of the judging panel once ANT1 announced the show. Michalis Hatzigiannis was the first to be rumored as he is one of the biggest singers in both Cyprus and Greece. On the running were also Eleonora Zouganeli and George Levendis. After being a judge in third season on So You Think You Can Dance, Eleni Foureira was in the running for the judging panel. On September 9, 2019, ANT1 announced that Michalis Hatzigiannis, Eleni Foureira, Michalis Kouinelis and Nikos Moraitis will be the four judges of the show. After one Week, ANT1 announced that Moraitis will not be a judge and so will be only three judges.

After hosting the first two seasons of The Voice of Greece, Giorgos Liagkas was rumored to be the host of the show. A few days later, Zeta Makripoulia was unofficially confirmed to be the host of the show and on July 25, 2019, the broadcaster revealed that Makripoulia will be hosting the show.

The Four 
Key
  Winner 
  Runner-up
  Third place

Artists 
Key
 – Artist started as "Original Four". 
 – Artist secured a spot and has remained in "The Four".
 – Artist received "Yes" from the judges but lost in the duel.  
 – Artist received "No" from the judges.

References

External links
 

ANT1 original programming
2019 Greek television series debuts
2019 Greek television series endings
2019 Greek television seasons
2010s Greek television series
Television shows set in Greece